The National Hockey League (NHL) first held a regular season outdoor ice hockey game in 2003, and since 2008 the league has scheduled at least one per year.

The NHL primarily uses three brands for outdoor games: the Heritage Classic, Winter Classic, and Stadium Series. The 2003 Heritage Classic between the Edmonton Oilers and Montreal Canadiens was the first outdoor regular season game in NHL history. The Heritage Classic has since been held infrequently, featuring match-ups solely between Canadian teams, until the Buffalo Sabres make their appearance in the 2022 Heritage Classic. The annual Winter Classic, held on New Year's Day in the United States, began with the 2008 game between the Pittsburgh Penguins and the Buffalo Sabres. The NHL then started the Stadium Series in 2014 for additional outdoor games. The number of Stadium Series games has varied per season (four in 2014, only one in 2015, two in 2016, and one per season since 2017). Both the Winter Classic and the Stadium series featured match-ups solely between American teams until the Toronto Maple Leafs' appearances in both the 2014 Winter Classic and the 2018 Stadium Series.

To celebrate the NHL's 100 year anniversary in 2017, the league scheduled two special outdoor games: the NHL Centennial Classic between Detroit and Toronto on January 1 (through season 2016-2017) to kick off the year, and then the NHL 100 Classic on December 16 (during 2017–2018 season) between Montreal and the Ottawa Senators to commemorate the league's first game, having taken place exactly 100 years before, between the same contenders. The four teams involved in said honorific matches, alongside Boston and New York, constitute the sprinkling count of the league's earliest members. Then in 2021 due to the COVID-19 pandemic, the league held the NHL Outdoors at Lake Tahoe, two outdoor games played without spectators.

Prior to 2003, NHL teams had been involved in at least three outdoor exhibitions. Two of these came in the 1950s and were effectively informal scrimmages; in 1954, the Detroit Red Wings visited Marquette Branch Prison and played a match against the prison inmates in a fenced-off, open air ice rink, while in 1956, the Boston Bruins played a game against several local teams in Bay Roberts, Newfoundland. In neither case was a formal game structure maintained or score kept, as the NHL teams hopelessly outmatched the hosts. In 1991, the Los Angeles Kings and New York Rangers played a pre-season game outside Caesars Palace in Las Vegas, in the first officially sanctioned outdoor NHL contest.

The NHL's outdoor series have proven wildly popular with fans and have led to numerous attendance records. The 2003 Heritage Classic drew 57,167 fans, a league record that stood until 71,217 fans in Buffalo set another NHL record in the inaugural Winter Classic in 2008. The 2014 Winter Classic, between Toronto and the Detroit Red Wings drew 105,491 fans, the current NHL record.

History
The first outdoor game on record to feature an NHL team was attempted on February 2, 1954. The Detroit Red Wings played an exhibition game on an outdoor ice surface, in  degree weather, against the Marquette Pirates, an athletic club composed of inmates at Michigan's Marquette Branch Prison. The game, and the Pirates club, was allegedly organized as a way for Red Wings manager Jack Adams to make good with two convicted mafia members incarcerated at the prison. By the end of the first period alone, the Red Wings had amassed an 18–0 score against the prisoners; score keeping was abandoned after that point and the rest of the game effectively became an informal scrimmage.

Two years after the 1954 prison match, the Boston Bruins went on a postseason barnstorm of Atlantic Canada in April 1956, which included a stop in Bay Roberts, Newfoundland. On April 9, 1956 the Bruins played an exhibition game against teams from the Conception Bay North Hockey League on an outdoor artificial ice surface, under similar rules to those of the 1954 prison match. Four teams each played one period against the Bruins who dominated the game. Only one goal was scored on Terry Sawchuk by the local teams.

During their time at the Civic Arena, the Pittsburgh Penguins could have theoretically hosted an outdoor NHL game due to the arena having a retractable roof. (The arena was originally built for the Pittsburgh Civic Light Opera, who only stayed at the arena until 1973.) However, the roof was always closed during hockey games with both the Penguins and their AHL predecessors, the Pittsburgh Hornets, whom the Penguins replaced upon the 1967 NHL expansion. The roof was permanently closed after 1994 when the Penguins replaced the center scoreboard.

The first outdoor game between two NHL teams (and the first played to completion) was an official pre-season match-up on September 27, 1991. The game took place in the parking lot of Caesars Palace in Las Vegas, Nevada, and featured the Los Angeles Kings and the New York Rangers. The process of keeping the ice cool in the desert heat required three times as much coolant as a standard NHL rink. During the contest grasshoppers began to jump onto the ice, where they would freeze or drown in water used to maintain the ice, and by the end of the second period the ice was littered with the bugs. Nearly 14,000 fans watched the Kings defeat the Rangers 5–2. From 1997 to 2016, the Los Angeles Kings returned to Las Vegas to play an annual indoors preseason game as part of the Frozen Fury series. In 2016, Las Vegas obtained its own NHL franchise and the fury series was moved to Salt Lake City, Utah.

The first regular season outdoor game in the history of the NHL took place on November 22, 2003, at Edmonton's Commonwealth Stadium, when the Edmonton Oilers played the Montreal Canadiens in the 2003 Heritage Classic. The Oilers had suggested the idea of hosting an outdoor game as early as the mid 1980s, but the genesis of the 2003 event was the "Cold War" outdoor game played two years prior between Michigan State University and the University of Michigan.

In 2005, NBC Sports Executive VP Jon Miller then pitched the concept an annual outdoor game as a television event to the NHL, "but they didn't find the concept workable." In December 2006, Miller found an ally in then-league Executive VP/Business & Media John Collins, who embraced the idea. This led to the inaugural Winter Classic game on January 1, 2008, with the Pittsburgh Penguins visiting the Buffalo Sabres at Ralph Wilson Stadium.

On May 1, 2013, the NHL announced that the Chicago Blackhawks would host the Pittsburgh Penguins at Soldier Field in Chicago on March 1, 2014, as part of a new series of outdoor games called the NHL Stadium Series. By the end of May 2013, the NHL had scheduled a record six outdoor NHL games for the 2013–14 season: one Winter Classic, one Heritage Classic, and four Stadium Series games.

In scheduling outdoor games in the New York metropolitan area that feature the New York Rangers (first occurring during two of the four 2014 Stadium Series games, and subsequently the 2018 Winter Classic), the team has always been designated as the "away" team. This is to maintain the property tax-exempt status of the Rangers' home arena, Madison Square Garden (MSG). The tax exemption stipulates that it only applies if the Rangers do not "cease playing" home games at MSG, generally interpreted as playing any "home" game outside of MSG. By designating the Rangers as the "away" team and Buffalo as the "home" team in the 2018 Winter Classic at Citi Field in New York City, it would save MSG from paying more than $40 million in property taxes.

Up until 2013, NHL's outdoor games were held exclusively in Canada and in the Midwest and Northeast United States. That changed in the 2014 Stadium Series when the Los Angeles Kings became the first West Coast team to host a regular season outdoor game, facing their in-city rival Anaheim Ducks at Dodger Stadium in Los Angeles on January 25. The San Jose Sharks followed suit, hosting their archrival Kings in the 2015 NHL Stadium Series at Levi's Stadium in Santa Clara. The first outdoor game to take place in a Southern state took place in the 2020 Winter Classic when the Dallas Stars hosted the Nashville Predators at the Cotton Bowl in Dallas.

In 2016, the Penguins and the Philadelphia Flyers worked out an agreement to play a home-and-home series of outdoors games. The two archrivals played the 2017 Stadium Series game at Heinz Field in Pittsburgh, and then played the 2019 Stadium Series game at Lincoln Financial Field in Philadelphia. The two teams had also discussed playing a neutral site game at Beaver Stadium at State College, Pennsylvania, but this did not materialize, due mainly to concerns about Beaver Stadium's plumbing being unable to withstand an event in winter  On March 6, 2016, the NHL officially announced that the Jets will host the Oilers in the 2016 Heritage Classic during the 2016–17 NHL season, held in October.

To celebrate the NHL's 100th year in 2017, the league held two special outdoor games. The first, branded as the Centennial Classic, between the Detroit Red Wings and Toronto Maple Leafs, was held on January 1 (during the 2016–17 NHL season) to kick off the year. The second, branded as the NHL 100 Classic, was held on December 16 (during the 2017–18 season) between the Montreal Canadiens and the Ottawa Senators.

When the 2018 NHL Stadium Series at Navy–Marine Corps Memorial Stadium at the U.S. Naval Academy was announced, NHL commissioner Gary Bettman said that it was the start of a unique partnership with the U.S. military in which the league plans to host outdoor games at military service academies around the United States. The 2020 NHL Stadium Series was held at Falcon Stadium at the U.S. Air Force Academy on February 15, 2020.

In 2021, the NHL announced the creation of a two-game series, the NHL Outdoors at Lake Tahoe, to function as the replacement for the cancelled outdoor games of the 2020–21 season. In view of the COVID-19 pandemic, fans would not be allowed at the games and instead the games would serve as a made-for-television event intended to simulate pond hockey.

Rule differences
The NHL outdoor games have additional weather-related rules, including:

 At the discretion of the NHL Commissioner, a game may be subject to temporary stoppages due to unplayable weather conditions. The period and game format may then be modified to accommodate those conditions.
 If there are high winds or other weather conditions that may give the team at one end an unfair advantage, a "hard whistle" will be signaled at the 10:00 minute mark of the third period, and then at the 2:30 minute mark of overtime (if necessary), stopping play immediately and the teams will switch sides.
 During shootouts, both teams may choose to defend the same goal.
 If a game is stopped permanently once two periods have been played, it can then be declared a completed official game. If the score is still tied however, the teams will still hold a shootout, whether at the same outdoor rink or at a different venue at a later date.

The 2008 NHL Winter Classic was the first game to use "hard whistle" stoppages during the third period and overtime, and to have the teams defend the same goal during the shootout.

The 2011 NHL Winter Classic was delayed from its original 1:00 p.m. start time to 8:00 p.m. due to warm temperatures and rain in the forecast. The start time of the 2012 NHL Winter Classic was also delayed two hours due to the sun hitting the ice. Sunlight also adversely affected the ice conditions of the first game of the NHL Outdoors at Lake Tahoe, causing the start of the second period to be delayed for several hours. The start time of the second Lake Tahoe game was also delayed because of the conditions.

Hosting statistics

As of February 2023:
 28 of the NHL's 32 teams have participated in an outdoor regular season game. Seattle is slated to host the 2024 Winter Classic. This leaves Arizona, Columbus, and Florida, as the only teams that have never been selected.
 17 teams have played more than one game.
 Chicago and Pittsburgh are tied for the most appearances (6).
 21 metropolitan areas (out of 28 represented among the league's 32 teams) have hosted outdoor regulation games. In addition to the six metropolitan areas represented by teams that have not played in any outdoor games, Montreal has played in outdoor games but has yet to host any themselves (New Jersey has also not yet hosted a home game in its home state despite having the capacity to do so, its home city of Newark is still part of the New York metropolitan area.)
 New York City, Massachusetts and Chicago/Northern Indiana have each hosted three games. Maryland–DC, Colorado, Pittsburgh, and Winnipeg/Eastern Prairies have each hosted twice.
 Yankee Stadium, Fenway Park, Heinz Field, and Commonwealth Stadium will have each hosted two games.
 In the 2019 Heritage Classic, Saskatchewan (a province that has been a longshot candidate for NHL expansion for decades) became the first fully neutral-site territory to host an outdoor regular season game, with Winnipeg as the designated home team (their second).
 During the 2021 NHL Outdoors at Lake Tahoe when two games were played, Vegas played in the first contest, where Lake Tahoe is considered part of Vegas' home territory.) The site was thus a fully neutral-site territory during the second game between Philadelphia and Boston.

Cancelled and postponed games
The Dallas Stars had originally been scheduled to play a stadium game at Houston's Reliant Stadium during their 2011 pre-season, but this game was ultimately cancelled.

The 2013 NHL Winter Classic was originally scheduled to be contested at Michigan Stadium between the Detroit Red Wings and Toronto Maple Leafs. Due to the 2012–13 NHL lockout resulting in an abbreviated 2012–13 season, this Winter Classic matchup at Michigan Stadium was postponed and would be held during the following season instead.

The Winnipeg Jets announced in 2013 that they had reached an agreement with the NHL to host a fourth Heritage Classic at Investors Group Field, the home of the CFL's Winnipeg Blue Bombers, which they hoped to hold during the team's fifth anniversary in 2015–16. However, a disagreement occurred between the NHL and the Winnipeg Blue Bombers over the game's exact date: the league wanted it held in December 2015 while the football team became concerned that this date was too close to the 103rd Grey Cup being held at the stadium on November 29. In January 2015, the Jets announced that they could not reach an agreement to finalize a date for the Heritage Classic during the 2015–16 season and that they were now looking for a new date during the 2016–17 season.  On March 6, 2016, the NHL officially announced that the Jets would host the Oilers in the 2016 Heritage Classic during the 2016–17 NHL season, held in October.

For the 2020–21 season, the 2021 NHL Winter Classic was originally planned to take place at Target Field between the St. Louis Blues and the Minnesota Wild, and the Carolina Hurricanes were scheduled to host a Stadium Series game at Carter-Finley Stadium on February 20, 2021. Due to the COVID-19 pandemic delaying the conclusion of the previous season to September and postponing the start of a shortened 2020–21 season to January, as well as uncertainty about fan attendance because of local health restrictions, the two events were postponed to 2022 at the earliest; an opponent for the Hurricanes was not yet determined at the time the postponement was made. On June 28, 2021, the league confirmed that the Blues and the Wild would play in the 2022 Winter Classic at Target Field, but the Hurricanes asked the league to postpone their outdoor game for another year to at least the 2022–23 season "to assure a safe environment." The Hurricanes would become the first warm-climate Eastern Conference team to host an outdoor game.

List of NHL outdoor games

† Due to rain being forecast, the BC Place retractable roof was kept closed for the game.

§ Game was originally scheduled for 2021, but postponed due to Covid-19 pandemic.

Outdoor games by team

This table excludes exhibition games with non-NHL opponents (such as those in 1954 and 1956) and pre-season games (such as the one in 1991).

‡ The Rangers were designated as the visiting team for the three games held in New York City to comply with a property tax exemption for Madison Square Garden that requires the Rangers to play all of their home games at the arena.

Italics indicate a future outdoor game.

References

External links